Knorr is a German food and beverage brand. It has been owned by the British company Unilever since 2000, when Unilever acquired Best Foods, excluding Japan, where it is made under licence by Ajinomoto. It produces dehydrated soup and meal mixes, bouillon cubes and condiments.

It was known as Royco in Indonesia, Kenya, and the Netherlands, and as Continental in Australia and New Zealand. Knorr is also produced in India and Pakistan.

History

Knorr was founded in 1838 by Carl Heinrich Theodor Knorr (1800–1875). Knorr headquarters are in Heilbronn, Germany. Products previously sold under the Lipton brand are now being absorbed into the Knorr product line. With annual sales topping €3 billion, Knorr is Unilever's biggest selling brand.

An Israeli company, based in Haifa, Israel Edible Products, produces kosher soups for Knorr that are sold in Israel and the United States.

Bouillon cubes
In 1912, the first Knorr bouillon cube was introduced. Carl Heinrich Knorr began experimenting with drying vegetables and seasoning to preserve nutrition and flavour, which led to Knorr's first launch of dried soups across Continental Europe in 1873. The bouillon cube is typically made from vegetables and meat.

Worldwide
Knorr is available around the world. By 2000, the Knorr brand expanded to nearly ninety countries, from eight countries in 1957. In Japan, Knorr is owned by Ajinomoto.

In the UK, the brand is known for its association with restaurateur Marco Pierre White.

In Switzerland, the small red imp-like figure on packaging is known as "Knorrli" and was first used as a brand mascot in 1948.

See also

Aromat
Bouillon cube
Broth
List of dried foods

References

External links

Unilever brands
Ajinomoto brands 
German brands
Dried foods
Products introduced in 1838
Companies based in Baden-Württemberg
Companies based in Heilbronn